Ayre is one of the six sheadings (governmental subdivisions) in the Isle of Man.

Ayre may also refer to:

People
Ayre (surname)

Geography
Ayre (landform), a shingle beach, particularly in Orkney and Shetland
Point of Ayre, northernmost point of the Isle of Man
Point of Ayre, Orkney

Other uses
Ayre or Air (music), a variant of the musical song form
Ayre and Sons, defunct department store chain founded by Charles Ayre
Ayre Acoustics, an audio equipment manufacturer

See also
Aire (disambiguation)
Ayres (disambiguation)
Ayr (disambiguation)
Eyre (disambiguation)